A camera obscura is a darkened room with a small hole or lens at one side through which an image is projected onto a wall or table opposite the hole.

Camera obscura can also refer to analogous constructions such as a box or tent in which an exterior image is projected inside. Camera obscuras with a lens in the opening have been used since the second half of the 16th century and became popular as aids for drawing and painting. The concept was developed further into the photographic camera in the first half of the 19th century, when camera obscura boxes were used to expose light-sensitive materials to the projected image.

The camera obscura was used to study eclipses without the risk of damaging the eyes by looking directly into the sun. As a drawing aid, it allowed tracing the projected image to produce a highly accurate representation, and was especially appreciated as an easy way to achieve proper graphical perspective.

Before the term camera obscura was first used in 1604, other terms were used to refer to the devices: cubiculum obscurum, cubiculum tenebricosum, conclave obscurum, and locus obscurus.

A camera obscura without a lens but with a very small hole is sometimes referred to as a pinhole camera, although this more often refers to simple (homemade) lensless cameras where photographic film or photographic paper is used.

Physical explanation
Rays of light travel in straight lines and change when they are reflected and partly absorbed by an object, retaining information about the color and brightness of the surface of that object. Lighted objects reflect rays of light in all directions. A small enough opening in a barrier admits only the rays that travel directly from different points in the scene on the other side, and these rays form an image of that scene where they reach a surface opposite from the opening.

The human eye (and those of animals such as birds, fish, reptiles etc.) works much like a camera obscura with an opening (pupil), a convex lens, and a surface where the image is formed (retina). Some cameras obscura use a concave mirror for a focusing effect similar to a convex lens.

Technology

A camera obscura consists of a box, tent, or room with a small hole in one side or the top. Light from an external scene passes through the hole and strikes a surface inside, where the scene is reproduced, inverted (upside-down) and reversed (left to right), but with color and perspective preserved.

To produce a reasonably clear projected image, the aperture is typically smaller than 1/100th the distance to the screen.
As the pinhole is made smaller, the image gets sharper, but dimmer. With a too small pinhole, however, the sharpness worsens, due to diffraction. Optimum sharpness is attained with an aperture diameter approximately equal to the geometric mean of the wavelength of light and the distance to the screen.

In practice, camera obscuras use a lens rather than a pinhole because it allows a larger aperture, giving a usable brightness while maintaining focus.

If the image is caught on a translucent screen, it can be viewed from the back so that it is no longer reversed (but still upside-down).  Using mirrors, it is possible to project a right-side-up image. The projection can also be displayed on a horizontal surface (e.g., a table). The 18th-century overhead version in tents used mirrors inside a kind of periscope on the top of the tent.

The box-type camera obscura often has an angled mirror projecting an upright image onto tracing paper placed on its glass top. Although the image is viewed from the back, it is reversed by the mirror.

History

Prehistory to 500 BC: Possible inspiration for prehistoric art and possible use in religious ceremonies, gnomons
There are theories that occurrences of camera obscura effects (through tiny holes in tents or in screens of animal hide) inspired paleolithic cave paintings. Distortions in the shapes of animals in many paleolithic cave artworks might be inspired by distortions seen when the surface on which an image was projected was not straight or not in the right angle.
It is also suggested that camera obscura projections could have played a role in Neolithic structures.

Perforated gnomons projecting a pinhole image of the sun were described in the Chinese Zhoubi Suanjing writings (1046 BC–256 BC with material added until circa 220 AD). The location of the bright circle can be measured to tell the time of day and year. In Arab and European cultures its invention was much later attributed to Egyptian astronomer and mathematician Ibn Yunus around 1000 AD.

500 BC to 500 AD: Earliest written observations

One of the earliest known written records of a pinhole camera for camera obscura effect is found in the Chinese text called Mozi, dated to the 4th century BC, traditionally ascribed to and named for Mozi (circa 470 BC-circa 391 BC), a Chinese philosopher and the founder of Mohist School of Logic. These writings explain how the image in a "collecting-point" or "treasure house" is inverted by an intersecting point (pinhole) that collects the (rays of) light. Light coming from the foot of an illuminated person were partly hidden below (i.e., strike below the pinhole) and partly formed the top of the image. Rays from the head were partly hidden above (i.e., strike above the pinhole) and partly formed the lower part of the image.

Another early account is provided by Greek philosopher Aristotle (384–322 BC), or possibly a follower of his ideas. Similar to the later 11th-century Arab scientist Alhazen, Aristotle is also thought to have used camera obscura for observing solar eclipses. Camera obscura is touched upon as a subject in Aristotle's work Problems – Book XV, asking:  and further on: 

Many philosophers and scientists of the Western world pondered this question before it was accepted that the circular and crescent-shapes described in the "problem" were pinhole image projections of the sun. Although a projected image has the shape of the aperture when the light source, aperture and projection plane are close together, the projected image has the shape of the light source when they are farther apart.

In his book Optics (circa 300 BC, surviving in later manuscripts from around 1000 AD), Euclid proposed mathematical descriptions of vision with "lines drawn directly from the eye pass through a space of great extent" and "the form of the space included in our vision is a cone, with its apex in the eye and its base at the limits of our vision." Later versions of the text, like Ignazio Danti's 1573 annotated translation, would add a description of the camera obscura principle to demonstrate Euclid's ideas.

500 to 1000: Earliest experiments, study of light

In the 6th century, the Byzantine-Greek mathematician and architect Anthemius of Tralles (most famous as a co-architect of the Hagia Sophia) experimented with effects related to the camera obscura. Anthemius had a sophisticated understanding of the involved optics, as demonstrated by a light-ray diagram he constructed in 555 AD.

In the 10th century Yu Chao-Lung supposedly projected images of pagoda models through a small hole onto a screen to study directions and divergence of rays of light.

1000 to 1400: Optical and astronomical tool, entertainment

Arab physicist Ibn al-Haytham (known in the West by the Latinised Alhazen) (965–1040) extensively studied the camera obscura phenomenon in the early 11th century.

In his treatise "On the shape of the eclipse" he provided the first experimental and mathematical analysis of the phenomenon. 
He must have understood the relationship between the focal point and the pinhole.

In his Book of Optics (circa 1027), Ibn al-Haytham explained that rays of light travel in straight lines and are distinguished by the body that reflected the rays, writing:
He described a "dark chamber", and experimented with light passing through small pinholes, using three adjacent candles and seeing the effects on the wall after placing a cutout between the candles and the wall.

Ibn al-Haytham also analyzed the rays of sunlight and concluded that they made a conic shape where they met at the hole, forming another conic shape reverse to the first one from the hole to the opposite wall in the dark room. Latin translations of his writings on optics were very influential in Europe from about 1200 onward. Among those he inspired were Witelo, John Peckham, Roger Bacon, Leonardo da Vinci, René Descartes and Johannes Kepler.

In his 1088 book, Dream Pool Essays, the Song Dynasty Chinese scientist Shen Kuo (1031–1095) compared the focal point of a concave burning-mirror and the "collecting" hole of camera obscura phenomena to an oar in a rowlock to explain how the images were inverted:

Shen Kuo also responded to a statement of Duan Chengshi in Miscellaneous Morsels from Youyang written in about 840 that the inverted image of a Chinese pagoda tower beside a seashore, was inverted because it was reflected by the sea: "This is nonsense. It is a normal principle that the image is inverted after passing through the small hole."

English statesman and scholastic philosopher Robert Grosseteste (c. 1175 – 9 October 1253) was one of the earliest Europeans who commented on the camera obscura.

English philosopher and Franciscan friar Roger Bacon (c. 1219/20 – c. 1292) falsely stated in his De Multiplicatione Specerium (1267) that an image projected through a square aperture was round because light would travel in spherical waves and therefore assumed its natural shape after passing through a hole. He is also credited with a manuscript that advised to study solar eclipses safely by observing the rays passing through some round hole and studying the spot of light they form on a surface.

A picture of a three-tiered camera obscura (see illustration) has been attributed to Bacon, but the source for this attribution is not given. A very similar picture is found in Athanasius Kircher's Ars Magna Lucis et Umbrae (1646).

Polish friar, theologian, physicist, mathematician and natural philosopher Erazmus Ciołek Witelo (also known as Vitello Thuringopolonis and by many different spellings of the name "Witelo") wrote about the camera obscura in his very influential treatise Perspectiva (circa 1270–1278), which was largely based on Ibn al-Haytham's work.

English archbishop and scholar John Peckham (circa 1230 – 1292) wrote about the camera obscura in his Tractatus de Perspectiva (circa 1269–1277) and Perspectiva communis (circa 1277–79), falsely arguing that light gradually forms the circular shape after passing through the aperture. His writings were influenced by Roger Bacon.

At the end of the 13th century, Arnaldus de Villa Nova is credited with using a camera obscura to project live performances for entertainment.

French astronomer Guillaume de Saint-Cloud suggested in his 1292 work Almanach Planetarum that the eccentricity of the sun could be determined with the camera obscura from the inverse proportion between the distances and the apparent solar diameters at apogee and perigee.

Kamāl al-Dīn al-Fārisī (1267–1319) described in his 1309 work Kitab Tanqih al-Manazir (The Revision of the Optics) how he experimented with a glass sphere filled with water in a camera obscura with a controlled aperture and found that the colors of the rainbow are phenomena of the decomposition of light.

French Jewish philosopher, mathematician, physicist and astronomer/astrologer Levi ben Gershon (1288–1344) (also known as Gersonides or Leo de Balneolis) made several astronomical observations using a camera obscura with a Jacob's staff, describing methods to measure the angular diameters of the sun, the moon and the bright planets Venus and Jupiter. He determined the eccentricity of the sun based on his observations of the summer and winter solstices in 1334. Levi also noted how the size of the aperture determined the size of the projected image. He wrote about his findings in Hebrew in his treatise Sefer Milhamot Ha-Shem (The Wars of the Lord) Book V Chapters 5 and 9.

1450 to 1600: Depiction, lenses, drawing aid, mirrors

Italian polymath Leonardo da Vinci (1452–1519), familiar with the work of Alhazen in Latin translation, and after an extensive study of optics and human vision, wrote the oldest known clear description of the camera obscura in mirror writing in a notebook in 1502, later published in the collection Codex Atlanticus (translated from Latin):

These descriptions, however, would remain unknown until Venturi deciphered and published them in 1797.

Da Vinci was clearly very interested in the camera obscura: over the years he drew circa 270 diagrams of the camera obscura in his notebooks . He systematically experimented with various shapes and sizes of apertures and with multiple apertures (1, 2, 3, 4, 8, 16, 24, 28 and 32). He compared the working of the eye to that of the camera obscura and seemed especially interested in its capability of demonstrating basic principles of optics: the inversion of images through the pinhole or pupil, the non-interference of images and the fact that images are "all in all and all in every part".

The oldest known published drawing of a camera obscura is found in Dutch physician, mathematician and instrument maker Gemma Frisius’ 1545 book De Radio Astronomica et Geometrica, in which he described and illustrated how he used the camera obscura to study the solar eclipse of 24 January 1544

Italian polymath Gerolamo Cardano described using a glass disc – probably a biconvex lens – in a camera obscura in his 1550 book De subtilitate, vol. I, Libri IV. He suggested to use it to view "what takes place in the street when the sun shines" and advised to use a very white sheet of paper as a projection screen so the colours wouldn't be dull.

Sicilian mathematician and astronomer Francesco Maurolico (1494–1575) answered Aristotle's problem how sunlight that shines through rectangular holes can form round spots of light or crescent-shaped spots during an eclipse in his treatise Photismi de lumine et umbra (1521–1554). However this wasn't published before 1611, after Johannes Kepler had published similar findings of his own.

Italian polymath Giambattista della Porta described the camera obscura, which he called "obscurum cubiculum", in the 1558 first edition of his book series Magia Naturalis. He suggested to use a convex lens to project the image onto paper and to use this as a drawing aid. Della Porta compared the human eye to the camera obscura: "For the image is let into the eye through the eyeball just as here through the window". The popularity of Della Porta's books helped spread knowledge of the camera obscura.

In his 1567 work La Pratica della Perspettiva Venetian nobleman Daniele Barbaro (1513-1570) described using a camera obscura with a biconvex lens as a drawing aid and points out that the picture is more vivid if the lens is covered as much as to leave a circumference in the middle.

In his influential and meticulously annotated Latin edition of the works of Ibn al-Haytham and Witelo,  (1572), German mathematician Friedrich Risner proposed a portable camera obscura drawing aid; a lightweight wooden hut with lenses in each of its four walls that would project images of the surroundings on a paper cube in the middle. The construction could be carried on two wooden poles. A very similar setup was illustrated in 1645 in Athanasius Kircher's influential book Ars Magna Lucis Et Umbrae.

Around 1575 Italian Dominican priest, mathematician, astronomer, and cosmographer Ignazio Danti designed a camera obscura gnomon and a meridian line for the Basilica of Santa Maria Novella, Florence and he later had a massive gnomon built in the San Petronio Basilica in Bologna. The gnomon was used to study the movements of the sun during the year and helped in determining the new Gregorian calendar for which Danti took place in the commission appointed by Pope Gregorius XIII and instituted in 1582.

In his 1585 book Diversarum Speculationum Mathematicarum Venetian mathematician Giambattista Benedetti proposed to use a mirror in a 45-degree angle to project the image upright. This leaves the image reversed, but would become common practice in later camera obscura boxes.

Giambattista della Porta added a "lenticular crystal" or biconvex lens to the camera obscura description in the 1589 second edition of Magia Naturalis. He also described use of the camera obscura to project hunting scenes, banquets, battles, plays, or anything desired on white sheets. Trees, forests, rivers, mountains "that are really so, or made by Art, of Wood, or some other matter" could be arranged on a plain in the sunshine on the other side of the camera obscura wall. Little children and animals (for instance handmade deer, wild boars, rhinos, elephants, and lions) could perform in this set. "Then, by degrees, they must appear, as coming out of their dens, upon the Plain: The Hunter he must come with his hunting Pole, Nets, Arrows, and other necessaries, that may represent hunting: Let there be Horns, Cornets, Trumpets sounded: those that are in the Chamber shall see Trees, Animals, Hunters Faces, and all the rest so plainly, that they cannot tell whether they be true or delusions: Swords drawn will glister in at the hole, that they will make people almost afraid." 
Della Porta claimed to have shown such spectacles often to his friends. They admired it very much and could hardly be convinced by Della Porta's explanations that what they had seen was really an optical trick.

1600 to 1650: Name coined, camera obscura telescopy, portable drawing aid in tents and boxes

The earliest use of the term "camera obscura" is found in the 1604 book Ad Vitellionem Paralipomena by German mathematician, astronomer, and astrologer Johannes Kepler. Kepler discovered the working of the camera obscura by recreating its principle with a book replacing a shining body and sending threads from its edges through a many-cornered aperture in a table onto the floor where the threads recreated the shape of the book. He also realized that images are "painted" inverted and reversed on the retina of the eye and figured that this is somehow corrected by the brain. 
In 1607, Kepler studied the sun in his camera obscura and noticed a sunspot, but he thought it was Mercury transiting the sun.
In his 1611 book Dioptrice, Kepler described how the projected image of the camera obscura can be improved and reverted with a lens. It is believed he later used a telescope with three lenses to revert the image in the camera obscura.

In 1611, Frisian/German astronomers David and Johannes Fabricius (father and son) studied sunspots with a camera obscura, after realizing looking at the sun directly with the telescope could damage their eyes. They are thought to have combined the telescope and the camera obscura into camera obscura telescopy.

In 1612, Italian mathematician Benedetto Castelli wrote to his mentor, the Italian astronomer, physicist, engineer, philosopher, and mathematician Galileo Galilei about projecting images of the sun through a telescope (invented in 1608) to study the recently discovered sunspots. Galilei wrote about Castelli's technique to the German Jesuit priest, physicist, and astronomer Christoph Scheiner.

From 1612 to at least 1630, Christoph Scheiner would keep on studying sunspots and constructing new telescopic solar-projection systems. He called these "Heliotropii Telioscopici", later contracted to helioscope. For his helioscope studies, Scheiner built a box around the viewing/projecting end of the telescope, which can be seen as the oldest known version of a box-type camera obscura. Scheiner also made a portable camera obscura.

In his 1613 book Opticorum Libri Sex Belgian Jesuit mathematician, physicist, and architect François d'Aguilon described how some charlatans cheated people out of their money by claiming they knew necromancy and would raise the specters of the devil from hell to show them to the audience inside a dark room. The image of an assistant with a devil's mask was projected through a lens into the dark room, scaring the uneducated spectators.

By 1620 Kepler used a portable camera obscura tent with a modified telescope to draw landscapes. It could be turned around to capture the surroundings in parts.

Dutch inventor Cornelis Drebbel is thought to have constructed a box-type camera obscura which corrected the inversion of the projected image. In 1622, he sold one to the Dutch poet, composer, and diplomat Constantijn Huygens who used it to paint and recommended it to his artist friends. Huygens wrote to his parents (translated from French):

German Orientalist, mathematician, inventor, poet, and librarian Daniel Schwenter wrote in his 1636 book Deliciae Physico-Mathematicae about an instrument that a man from Pappenheim had shown him, which enabled movement of a lens to project more from a scene through the camera obscura. It consisted of a ball as big as a fist, through which a hole (AB) was made with a lens attached on one side (B). This ball was placed inside two-halves of part of a hollow ball that were then glued together (CD), in which it could be turned around. This device was attached to a wall of the camera obscura (EF). This universal joint mechanism was later called a scioptric ball.

In his 1637 book Dioptrique French philosopher, mathematician and scientist René Descartes suggested placing an eye of a recently dead man (or if a dead man was unavailable, the eye of an ox) into an opening in a darkened room and scraping away the flesh at the back until one could see the inverted image formed on the retina.

Italian Jesuit philosopher, mathematician, and astronomer Mario Bettini wrote about making a camera obscura with twelve holes in his Apiaria universae philosophiae mathematicae (1642). When a foot soldier would stand in front of the camera, a twelve-person army of soldiers making the same movements would be projected.

French mathematician, Minim friar, and painter of anamorphic art Jean-François Nicéron (1613–1646) wrote about the camera obscura with convex lenses. He explained how the camera obscura could be used by painters to achieve perfect perspective in their work. He also complained how charlatans abused the camera obscura to fool witless spectators and make them believe that the projections were magic or occult science. These writings were published in a posthumous version of La Perspective Curieuse (1652).

1650 to 1800: Introduction of the magic lantern, popular portable box-type drawing aid, painting aid
The use of the camera obscura to project special shows to entertain an audience seems to have remained very rare. A description of what was most likely such a show in 1656 in France, was penned by the poet Jean Loret, who expressed how rare and novel it was. The Parisian society were presented with upside-down images of palaces, ballet dancing and battling with swords. Loret felt somewhat frustrated that he did not know the secret that made this spectacle possible. There are several clues that this may have been a camera obscura show, rather than a very early magic lantern show, especially in the upside-down image and Loret's surprise that the energetic movements made no sound.

German Jesuit scientist Gaspar Schott heard from a traveler about a small camera obscura device he had seen in Spain, which one could carry under one arm and could be hidden under a coat. He then constructed his own sliding box camera obscura, which could focus by sliding a wooden box part fitted inside another wooden box part. He wrote about this in his 1657 Magia universalis naturæ et artis (volume 1 – book 4 "Magia Optica" pages 199–201).

By 1659 the magic lantern was introduced and partly replaced the camera obscura as a projection device, while the camera obscura mostly remained popular as a drawing aid. The magic lantern can be regarded as a (box-type) camera obscura device that projects images rather than actual scenes. In 1668, Robert Hooke described the difference for an installation to project the delightful "various apparitions and disappearances, the motions, changes and actions" by means of a broad convex-glass in a camera obscura setup: "if the picture be transparent, reflect the rays of the sun so as that they may pass through it towards the place where it is to be represented; and let the picture be encompassed on every side with a board or cloth that no rays may pass beside it. If the object be a statue or some living creature, then it must be very much enlightened by casting the sun beams on it by refraction, reflexion, or both." For models that can't be inverted, like living animals or candles, he advised: "let two large glasses of convenient spheres be placed at appropriate distances".

The 17th century Dutch Masters, such as Johannes Vermeer, were known for their magnificent attention to detail. It has been widely speculated that they made use of the camera obscura, but the extent of their use by artists at this period remains a matter of fierce contention, recently revived by the Hockney–Falco thesis.

German philosopher Johann Sturm published an illustrated article about the construction of a portable camera obscura box with a 45° mirror and an oiled paper screen in the first volume of the proceedings of the Collegium Curiosum, Collegium Experimentale, sive Curiosum (1676).

Johann Zahn's Oculus Artificialis Teledioptricus Sive Telescopium, published in 1685, contains many descriptions, diagrams, illustrations and sketches of both the camera obscura and the magic lantern. A hand-held device with a mirror-reflex mechanism was first proposed by Johann Zahn in 1685, a design that would later be used in photographic cameras.

The scientist Robert Hooke presented a paper in 1694 to the Royal Society, in which he described a portable camera obscura. It was a cone-shaped box which fit onto the head and shoulders of its user.

From the beginning of the 18th century, craftsmen and opticians would make camera obscura devices in the shape of books, which were much appreciated by lovers of optical devices.

One chapter in the Conte Algarotti's Saggio sopra Pittura (1764) is dedicated to the use of a camera ottica ("optic chamber") in painting.

By the 18th century, following developments by Robert Boyle and Robert Hooke, more easily portable models in boxes became available. These were extensively used by amateur artists while on their travels, but they were also employed by professionals, including Paul Sandby and Joshua Reynolds, whose camera (disguised as a book) is now in the Science Museum in London. Such cameras were later adapted by Joseph Nicephore Niepce, Louis Daguerre and William Fox Talbot for creating the first photographs.

Role in the modern age

While the technical principles of the camera obscura have been known since antiquity, the broad use of the technical concept in producing images with a linear perspective in paintings, maps, theatre setups, and architectural, and, later, photographic images and movies started in the Western Renaissance and the scientific revolution. Although Alhazen (Ibn al-Haytham) had already observed an optical effect and developed a pioneering theory of the refraction of light, he was less interested in producing images with it (compare Hans Belting 2005); the society he lived in was even hostile (compare Aniconism in Islam) toward personal images.

Western artists and philosophers used the Arab findings in new frameworks of epistemic relevance. For example, Leonardo da Vinci used the camera obscura as a model of the eye, René Descartes for eye and mind, and John Locke started to use the camera obscura as a metaphor of human understanding per se. The modern use of the camera obscura as an epistemic machine had important side effects for science.

While the use of the camera obscura has waxed and waned, one can still be built using a few simple items: a box, tracing paper, tape, foil, a box cutter, a pencil, and a blanket to keep out the light. Homemade camera obscura are popular primary- and secondary-school science or art projects.

In 1827, critic Vergnaud complained about the frequent use of camera obscura in producing many of the paintings at that year's Salon exhibition in Paris: "Is the public to blame, the artists, or the jury, when history paintings, already rare, are sacrificed to genre painting, and what genre at that!... that of the camera obscura." (translated from French)

British photographer Richard Learoyd has specialized in making pictures of his models and motifs with a camera obscura instead of a modern camera, combining it with the ilfochrome process which creates large grainless prints.

Other contemporary visual artists who have explicitly used camera obscura in their artworks include James Turrell, Abelardo Morell, Minnie Weisz, Robert Calafiore, Vera Lutter, Marja Pirilä, and Shi Guorui.

Gallery

Large public access installations

See also
 Bonnington Pavilion – the first Scottish Camera Obscura, dating from 1708
 Black mirror
 Bristol Observatory
 Camera lucida
 History of cinema
 Hockney–Falco thesis
 Optics
 Pepper's ghost

Notes

References

Sources

Hill, Donald R. (1993), "Islamic Science and Engineering", Edinburgh University Press, page 70.
Lindberg, D.C. (1976), "Theories of Vision from Al Kindi to Kepler", The University of Chicago Press, Chicago and London.
Nazeef, Mustapha (1940), "Ibn Al-Haitham As a Naturalist Scientist", published proceedings of the Memorial Gathering of Al-Hacan Ibn Al-Haitham, 21 December 1939, Egypt Printing.
Needham, Joseph (1986). Science and Civilization in China: Volume 4, Physics and Physical Technology, Part 1, Physics. Taipei: Caves Books Ltd.
Omar, S.B. (1977). "Ibn al-Haitham's Optics", Bibliotheca Islamica, Chicago.
 

Lefèvre, Wolfgang (ed.) Inside the Camera Obscura: Optics and Art under the Spell of the Projected Image. Max Planck Institut Fur Wissenschaftgesichte. Max Planck Institute for the History of Science 
Burkhard Walther, Przemek Zajfert: Camera Obscura Heidelberg. Black-and-white photography and texts. Historical and contemporary literature. edition merid, Stuttgart, 2006,

External links

Audiovisual introductions in 1502
17th-century neologisms
 
Optical toys
Optical devices
Artistic techniques
Precursors of photography
Precursors of film